Pleasant Valley is a census-designated place (CDP) in the town of Barkhamsted, Litchfield County, Connecticut, United States. It is in the southern part of the town, on the west side of the West Branch of the Farmington River.

Pleasant Valley was first listed as a CDP prior to the 2020 census.

References 

Census-designated places in Litchfield County, Connecticut
Census-designated places in Connecticut